Smith Village is a town in Oklahoma County, Oklahoma, United States, and a part of the Oklahoma City Metropolitan Area. The population was 66 at the 2010 census.

History
Rose Henrietta Smith inherited a twenty-acre farm which she subdivided into lots and created the Rose Smith Addition housing  development. The town encompasses three-tenths of a square mile and is bounded by Oklahoma City on the west side and by Del City on the North, East and South. In 1952 when Del City attempted to annex the addition, its residents decided to incorporate which was done by a vote in November 1952. Since 1952 a town government has been elected on an irregular basis. Water and sewer services are provided by Sooner Utilities.

Geography
Smith Village is located at  (35.451075, -97.457101).

According to the United States Census Bureau, the town has a total area of 0.0 mi2 (0.1 km2), all land.

Demographics

As of the census of 2010, there were 66 people, 26 households, and 20 families residing in the town. The population density was 1,390.5 inhabitants per square mile (514.8/km2). There were 20 housing units at an average density of 695.3 per square mile (257.4/km2). The racial makeup of the town was 85.00% White, 5.00% Native American, 5.00% from other races, and 5.00% from two or more races. Hispanic or Latino of any race were 7.50% of the population.

There were 26 households, out of which 23.1% had children under the age of 18 living with them, 50.0% were married couples living together, and 23.1% were non-families. 31.6% of all households were made up of individuals, and none had someone living alone who was 65 years of age or older. The average household size was 2.11 and the average family size was 2.64.

In the town, the population was spread out, with 17.5% under the age of 18, 7.5% from 18 to 24, 35.0% from 25 to 44, and 40.0% from 45 to 64. The median age was 42 years. For every 100 females, there were 110.5 males. For every 100 females age 18 and over, there were 135.7 males.

The median income for a household in the town was $40,000, and the median income for a family was $50,625. Males had a median income of $16,250 versus $30,833 for females. The per capita income for the town was $12,926. About 22.2% of families and 33.3% of the population were below the poverty line, including no under eighteens and 100.0% of those over 64.

See also
Del City

References

Oklahoma City metropolitan area
Towns in Oklahoma County, Oklahoma
Towns in Oklahoma